The Korean Mission in Taipei is the representative office of South Korea in Taiwan, functioning as a de facto embassy in the absence of diplomatic relations. Its counterpart is the Taipei Mission in Korea in Seoul.

Unlike American Institute in Taiwan or Japan–Taiwan Exchange Association, Korean Mission in Taipei is directly under control of the Ministry of Foreign Affairs of South Korea (MOFA), and the representative, the head of the Mission, is a position usually served by senior foreign service officers from MOFA. The other two actively work with either the United States Department of State or the Japanese Foreign Ministry, but in legal basis they are completely independent entities.

The Mission was established on 25 November following an agreement on 27 July 1993. This was after South Korea ceased to recognise the government in Taiwan as the Republic of China and closed its embassy in Taipei, following the establishment of relations with the People's Republic of China on August 27, 1992.

On 1 September 2004, representatives of the two missions signed an aviation agreement allowing aircraft of each side to enter the airspace of the other, permitting the resumption of direct scheduled flights by Korean and Taiwanese airlines, which had been discontinued in 1992.

Heads of Mission
The Korean Mission in Taipei is headed by a Representative, the following is a list of Representatives since the Mission's establishment in 1993.

See also
 Koreans in Taiwan
 South Korea–Taiwan relations
 List of diplomatic missions in Taiwan
 List of diplomatic missions of South Korea

References

External links
Korean Mission in Taipei (Korean)

Representative Offices in Taipei
Taipei
South Korea–Taiwan relations